Vijayaraghavan is an Indian surname. People with this surname include:

Pon. Vijayaraghavan, Congress politician from Tamil Nadu
Tirukkannapuram Vijayaraghavan (1902–1955), mathematician
Rangachari Vijayaraghavan (born 1946), cricket umpire
A. Vijayaraghavan
G. Vijayaraghavan (born 1942)
Ramanuja Vijayaraghavan (born 1931)
Usha Vijayaraghavan (born 1961)
Karthika Vijayaraghavan (born 1988), cricketer